Charles Parkin (1689–1765) was an English clergyman and antiquarian. He was rector of Oxburgh in Norfolk, and assisted Francis Blomefield on his history of the county, completing it after Blomefield's death.

Life
The son of William Parkin of London, a prosperous shoemaker, he was born on 11 January 1690, and educated at Merchant Taylors' School. In 1708 he went  to Pembroke Hall, Cambridge, graduating B.A. 1712 and  M.A. 1717. He married Mary, the widow of John Meriton the  rector of Oxburgh, Norfolk, in 1717. She died in 1732. they had no children.

Blomefield's History of Norfolk
He assisted Francis Blomefield with his History of Norfolk, writing the descriptions of  Oxburgh and the adjoining parishes. When Blomefield died in 1752,  having written about half of the third volume, Parkin undertook the completion of the unfinished History,  the fourth and fifth volumes of which (in the original five-volume folio edition, completed in 1775) were published under his name. According to Craven Ord, however, the last sheets were finished by a bookseller's hack, employed by Whittingham of Lynn. Parkin's Topography of Freebridge Hundred and Half in Norfolk, containing the History and Antiquities of the Borough of King's Lynn, and of the Towns, Villages, and Religious Buildings in that Hundred and Half  (London, 1762) was reprinted from the fourth volume.

William Stukeley and the Royston Cave
In the 1740s Parkin engaged in a vituperative   dispute with  William Stukeley over the antiquity and imagery of the carvings on the walls of the recently discovered  cave at Royston. He attacked  Stukeley's claim that the chamber had been the private oratory of one "Lady Roisia" 
in a pamphlet entitled  An Answer to, or Remarks upon, Dr. Stukeley's "Origines Roystonianæ" (London, 1744). When Stukeley published a reply, Parkin responded  with A Reply to the Peevish, Weak, and Malevolent Objections brought by Dr. Stukeley in his  Origines Roystonianæ, No.2 (Norwich, 1748). Joseph Beldam, a later historian of the cave, wrote that "though both parties showed abundant learning and ingenuity, the cause of truth suffered much from their mutual loss of temper.

Death and bequests
Parkin died on 27 August 1765, and by his will (dated 17 June 1759) bequeathed money to his old college for the foundation of exhibitions to be held by scholars from the  Merchant Taylors' School and from the free school at Bowes, Yorkshire, which had been founded by his uncle, William Hutchinson of Clement's Inn.

Notes

References
Attribution

1689 births
1765 deaths
18th-century English Anglican priests
English antiquarians
People from Breckland District
People educated at Merchant Taylors' School, Northwood
Alumni of Pembroke College, Cambridge